The Finnish Basketball Player of the Year is an annual award that is given to the best basketball player (male or female) with Finnish citizenship. Finnish players that are playing anywhere in the world, qualify for the award. The award is voted on by Finnish sports journalists. The award was first given in 1948. Hanno Möttölä has won the most player of the year awards, with eight. 

A female player has been chosen for the award three times. The first female selection was Hilkka Hakola, who won the player of the year award in 1956. Pekka Markkanen and Lauri Markkanen are the only father and son combination to win the award. The most recent player of the year winner is Lauri Markkanen, his sixth win in a row. He is the only Finnish player to be an NBA All Star.

Finnish Players of the Year

Number of awards won by player

See also
Finnish Basketball Hall of Fame
Finnish League MVP
Finnish League Finals MVP

References

Basketball in Finland
European basketball awards